TAK-994 is an orexin receptor agonist which is under development by Takeda for the treatment of narcolepsy. It is a small-molecule and orally active compound and acts as a highly selective agonist of the orexin receptor 2 (OX2) (>700-fold selectivity over the orexin receptor 1 (OX1)). TAK-994 is related to danavorexton (TAK-925). The compound reached phase 2 clinical trials for narcolepsy. However, clinical development was discontinued in October 2021 for safety reasons. The chemical structure of TAK-994 has yet to be disclosed.

See also
 Orexin receptor § Agonists
 List of investigational sleep drugs § Orexin receptor agonists

References

Experimental drugs
Orexin receptor agonists